Virtus Pallacanestro Bologna, known for sponsorship reasons as Virtus Segafredo Bologna, is an Italian professional basketball club based in Bologna, Emilia-Romagna.

The club was founded in 1927, which makes it the oldest club in Italy and one of the oldest in Europe. Virtus is the second most titled basketball club in Italy after Olimpia Milano, having won 16 Italian national championships, 8 Italian National Cups and 3 Italian Supercups. Moreover, it is one of the most successful teams in European competitions, having won two EuroLeagues, one EuroCup, one FIBA Saporta Cup, one EuroChallenge and one Basketball Champions League. It currently plays in the Italian first division LBA as well as in the EuroLeague. The club is owned by the coffee entrepreneur Massimo Zanetti.

Some of the club's star players over the years have included: Gianni Bertolotti, Tom McMillen, Carlo Caglieris, Renato Villalta, Marco Bonamico, Jim McMillian, Krešimir Ćosić, Roberto Brunamonti, Augusto Binelli, Micheal Ray Richardson, Jure Zdovc, Predrag Danilović, Cliff Levingston, Arijan Komazec, Orlando Woolridge, Zoran Savić, Bane Prelević, Alessandro Abbio, Radoslav Nesterović, Antoine Rigaudeau, Alessandro Frosini, Hugo Sconochini, Marko Jarić, Manu Ginóbili, Matjaž Smodiš, David Andersen, Travis Best, Keith Langford, Miloš Teodosić, Marco Belinelli, Daniel Hackett and Tornike Shengelia. While some of the club's greatest coaches had been: Vittorio Tracuzzi, Dan Peterson, Terry Driscoll, Alberto Bucci, Ettore Messina, Aleksandar Đorđević and Sergio Scariolo.

History

1929–1956: Beginnings and post-war dynasty
Virtus was founded in 1871 as a gymnastics club, forming its first professional basketball team in 1929 as part of a multi sports club. The club's motto was Forte Franco Fermo Fiero ("Strong Frank Firm Proud") and was inserted in the logo under the Black V, with a cross made by four F; the motto is still used by Virtus today. The team's home court was the former church of Santa Lucia in the city center, which could host a few hundred people.

The first official championship of Virtus dates back to 1934, the year in which the Bolognese team won the first division tournament, obtaining the promotion in the top tournament after a hard-fought group of playoffs against Unione Sportiva of Milan and Ginnastica Rome. Team's captain was Venzo Vannini, while other important players were Giuseppe Palmieri and Giancarlo Marinelli. After the promotion, Virtus settled permanently at the top of the national basketball league, and achieved a long series of honorable placings: in the nine championships disputed from 1935 to the outbreak of the Second World War, the Black V collected 6-second places, 2 third places, and a sixth place, however Virtus never achieved to win a national title.

From 1943 to 1945, the championship was suspended due to the outbreak of the war in the country and the beginning of the civil war. At the end of the world war, Santa Lucia was no longer available for basketball games and after a brief period of outdoor matches on a field in Via del Ravone, the team moved to Sala Borsa, the city's stock exchange, readjusted in the evening for basketball matches. This unusual venue became the hallmark of a new Italian basketball season, compared to the worldwide famous Boston Garden. In July 1945, Virtus, led by Achille Canna, Luigi Rapini and Antonio Calebotta, won its first national Serie A title, defeating 35–31 Reyer Venezia in the final.

In the following season, Renzo Poluzzi became the new head coach and led Virtus to its second championship. Under Poluzzi, Virtus won the title again in 1948 and 1949, achieving the so-called "four-peat". In 1949–50 season, the Black V arrived second after Olimpia Milano; during these years, the long-time rivalry with Olimpia, known as "derby of Italy", began. Olimpia won the title for the next four years too, while the Black V placed second in 1952 and 1953. In 1954, Vittorio Tracuzzi was appointed new head coach; Tracuzzi was a Virtus player too, acting as a "player-coach". At the end of the season, Tracuzzi led Virtus to its fifth national title. The team doubled the next season, achieving a so-called "back-to-back". During the 1950s the first derbies were played against Gira and Moto Morini, the other two teams of Bologna.

Due to the increasing fame of Virtus, the Sala Borsa was no longer suitable for hosting games; so in 1956, the long-time Mayor of Bologna, Giuseppe Dozza, inaugurated a new arena, which was simply known as "Sports Hall" and had a seating capacity of more than 7,000 people. The arena was later nicknamed Il Madison, after New York's Madison Square Garden and, in 1966, after Dozza's retirement from politics, it was renamed "PalaDozza". From 1956 to 1960, Virtus placed second, always behind its arch-rival Olimpia Milan. At the end of the 1959–60 season, Tracuzzi left Virtus after having won two championships in five seasons, with a winning record of 108–22, being widely considered one of Black V's greatest coaches of all time.

1960–1968: Post-dynasty struggles
In 1960, the Spanish coach, Eduardo Kucharski, succeeded Tracuzzi at the head of the team. Virtus, led by its best player Gianfranco Lombardi, took part in its first European Champions Cup, but it was ousted by CCA Bucarest in the second round. At the end of the Italian regular season, the Black V placed second again, behind Ignis Varese.

In 1962 and 1963 Virtus arrived third and Kucharski was sacked, while Mario Alesini, a former Virtus player, became the new head coach. However, in the next three seasons, Alesini did not reach to bring back the title to Bologna. In 1966, Jaroslav Šíp was hired as new head coach, but Virtus never became a real contender for the championship, with Olimpia and Ignis which alternatively won the title until 1968.

1968–1991: The Porelli era

The 1960s had been an unfortunate decade for Virtus. The turning point occurred in 1968, when the lawyer Gianluigi Porelli was appointed by the then president of the multi-sport club, Giovanni Elkan, at the head of the basketball section. Alternately nicknamed "Torquemada" or "Robespierre" for his quick and often dictatorial methods, or, more frequently, L'Avvocato ("The Lawyer"), Porelli has been one of the most prominent figures in the history of Virtus which, through initiatives often unpopular but almost always winning, definitively carried towards professionalism.

1968–1973: Rebuilding
As soon as he arrived, at only 38 years old, Porelli sacked coach Šíp and appointed Renzo Ranuzzi, a former player. However, Ranuzzi lasted one year only, due to the poor result of the team, which ended the season at the 10th place. After another poor result in the 1969–70 season under coach Nello Paratore, in 1970, Porelli hired Black V's legendary coach Vittorio Tracuzzi and sold the best player of the time, Gianfranco Lombardi, unleashing a popular uprising that even ended up in court. Despite Tracuzzi's comeback, the team placed 10th once again. In 1970, thanks to Porelli, Virtus was also one of the main proponents and founders of the Lega Basket, the governing body of the top-tier level professional Italian basketball league.

In the same year, Virtus broke away from the multi sports club, becoming a joint-stock company. Thanks to this choice, which was highly criticised at the time, Porelli definitively healed the club's finances. In 1971, Porelli hired the American player John Fultz who, supported by important Italian players like Gianni Bertolotti and Luigi Serafini, succeeded in placing the team 5th in the national championship, the best result since 1967–68. In the following season, the team, composed by the same players and coached by Nico Messina, arrived 6th.

1973–1978: Peterson's revolution
In 1973, Porelli opened a new season of triumphs, thanks to a partnership with Sinudyne, a famous Italian domestic appliances company, and especially with the engagement of the young American coach Dan Peterson, coming from the Chile's national basketball team. Virtus immediately won its first Italian Cup in 1973–74 season, which was club's first title since 1955–56.

In the following season, Virtus signed Tom McMillen, a 22-years-old player from Maryland University, who was selected with the 9th overall pick by the Buffalo Braves during the 1974 NBA draft. He signed with the Braves but postponed his entry into the NBA to attend the University of Oxford as a Rhodes Scholar. McMillen lived and studied in the UK, but he moved to Bologna during the weekends to play basketball. At the end of the season, characterized by outstanding performances by McMillen, the team placed 4th in the national championship and was eliminated at the quarterfinals of the European Cup Winners' Cup.

In 1975, McMillen started his career in the NBA, so Porelli and Peterson signed Terry Driscoll, a former NBA player and 4th overall pick in 1969 draft. Thanks to Driscoll's leadership and the fundamental support of Italian players like Carlo Caglieris, Gianni Bertolotti, Marco Bonamico and Luigi Serafini, Virtus won its seventh national championship, the first one after twenty years.

In 1976–77, Virtus ended first in the regular season, however it lost the championship finals against Varese, by 2–0. In the following season, the Black V succeeded in reaching the national finals, but nonetheless it lost 2–1 against Varese again. The team also reached the final of the Cup Winner's Cup, but lost 84–82 against Gabetti Cantù.

In 1978, after two consecutive second places, coach Peterson left the Black V to sign with its historic rival, Olimpia Milan. This move was heavily criticised by Black V's fans, but it was approved by Porelli himself. However, despite the controversies which rose around his farewell, Peterson's legacy was huge: the American coach deeply changed the team's organization and contributed in bringing back Virtus to the top of Italian basketball after twenty years of struggles.

1978–1980: Driscoll's back-to-back

After Peterson's departure, Terry Driscoll was appointed new head coach. Porelli signed also Krešimir Ćosić, one of the best centers in Europe; the team was also composed by great Italian players as Renato Villalta, Carlo Caglieris and the captain Gianni Bertolotti. In the national finals, Virtus faced its former coach, Dan Peterson and his new team, Olimpia. Despite the great expectations around a hard-fought final, the Black V easily won the title in only two games. The team also reached the semi-finals of the Cup Winners' Cup, where it was eliminated for only one point by the Dutch EBBC.

In the following season, Porelli signed Jim McMillian, a 1972 NBA champion with the Los Angeles Lakers. McMillian, who was immediately nicknamed by Virtus fans as Il Duca Nero ("The Black Duke"), led the team achieving a back-to-back, winning its ninth titles against Cantù. The team took part also in the European Champions Cup, where it was eliminated in the semi-finals group stage.

At the end of the season, Driscoll’s two year contract had expired. Porelli and Driscoll could not agree on a contract. Despite Driscoll’s great successes, first as player, one championship, and two championships as a coach in five years, when no agreement was reached, Driscoll chose to return to retire from basketball.

1980–1988: Champions Cup Final and 10th title

At the beginning of the 1980–81 season, Driscoll's assistant, Ettore Zuccheri, became the new head coach, but he was later replaced by Renzo Ranuzzi. The team reached once again the national finals, but it slightly lost the playoff series by 2–1 against Cantù. Returning to the top in Italy, the Black V attempted to become a major team in Europe too, and in 1981, Virtus reached the final of the FIBA European Champions Cup in Strasbourg. However, a few days before the final, McMillian suffered a serious injury against Brindisi and was forced not to play in the final, which then Virtus lost by only one point against Maccabi Tel Aviv, after a very contested game and dubious referees' choices.

After the defeat in the Cup, Porelli sacked Ranuzzi and hired coach Aleksandar Nikolić, worldwide known as "The Professor". The team was composed also by young and talented Italian players like Roberto Brunamonti and Augusto Binelli, as well as important foreign players, like the Bahamian center Elvis Rolle. Despite his fame, Nikolić did not succeed in bringing Virtus back to title, so in 1983, after the brief experiences of George Bisacca and Mauro Di Vincenzo, the 35 years-old Alberto Bucci, from Bologna, became the new head coach. In the same years, the club signed a deal with Granarolo, a milk and dairy production company, which became the new team's sponsor. Virtus ended the regular season second, after Peterson's Olimpia. The two teams faced themselves in a historic final, always remembered as one of the best in Italian basketball history, in which Virtus defeated Olimpia by 2–1, reaching its 10th national title, also known as La Stella ("The Star"), due to the star which is attributed to teams that manage to win ten national championships. In the same year, the team completed a domestic double by adding a National Cup.

In 1984–85, Virtus reached the semi-final group stage of the Champions Cup, where, however, it was eliminated. After a defeat in the playoffs' quarterfinals against Olimpia, Bucci was sacked and Sandro Gamba became the new coach. Gamba, one of the most successful Italian coaches of all time, did not succeed in winning with Virtus too, exiting in the first round of 1986 playoffs and being eliminated in the quarterfinals of 1987 playoffs. In 1988, Krešimir Ćosić, a former Virtus star, replaced Gamba. Despite the head coach's change, the team continued collecting poor successes, being ousted in the Korać Cup's quarterfinals and in the first round of national playoffs.

1988–1991: The "Sugar-mania"

In 1988, Porelli hired Bob Hill, who was New York Knicks' head coach until the previous season. Hill brought in Italy two former NBA players: Micheal Ray Richardson, an NBA All-Star and former player for the Knicks and New Jersey Nets, who was banned from the NBA for violations of league's drug policy, and Clemon Johnson, 1983 NBA champion with the Philadelphia 76ers, who also played for the Indiana Pacers and Seattle SuperSonics. At the beginning of the season, Porelli reached an agreement with Knorr, a German food and beverage brand, which became the team's sponsor. In 1988–89 Virtus won its third Italian Cup, but it was defeated in the semi-finals for the national championship against Enichem Livorno, coached by Bucci.

Despite the playoffs' elimination, the season was considered a rebirth for Virtus: the national cup was the team's first trophy since 1984 and the great performances of Richardson had brought back the passion for basketball in the city. This period became known as "Sugar-mania", from Richardson's historic nickname.

In the following summer, Hill surprisingly resigned from his post and his assistant, the 30 years-old Ettore Messina, was appointed new head coach. The Black V won the Italian Cup again and on 13 March 1990, won its first European title, the FIBA European Cup Winners' Cup, the second-tier level European-wide competition, defeating 79–74 the Real Madrid coached by George Karl. The final was characterized by an outstanding performance of Richardson, able of scoring 29 points. However, the team was once again eliminated in national playoffs' quarterfinals against Phonola Caserta.

In 1990–91, Virtus placed third in the regular season but it was once again eliminated in the national semi-finals by Caserta. At the end of the season, Richardson was not confirmed and signed for Slobodna Dalmacija, putting an end to a three-year period in which he brought Virtus to win its first European trophy and laid the foundations for club's successes in the following years.

In 1991, after two years of internal struggles within the shareholders' assembly, during which he also briefly lost the control of the club, Porelli sold Virtus to Alfredo Cazzola, a local trade fair entrepreneur. During 23 years of tenure, Porelli won four national titles, four Italian Cups and one Cup Winner's Cup, transforming a simple basketball section of a multisport club into one of the richest and most successful teams in Europe.

1991–2000: The Cazzola era 
As president, Cazzola brought to Virtus an entrepreneurial mentality, which would be necessary in the team's future growth. In the 1991–92 season, the Black V, led by captain Brunamonti and Jure Zdovc, reached the national semi-finals, but lost against Scavolini Pesaro, which had already eliminated Virtus in the national cup few months before. The team also lost against Partizan in the FIBA European League quarterfinals.

1992–1995: Danilović's three-peat

In the summer of 1992, Cazzola signed Predrag Danilović, a young Yugoslav player who won the latest FIBA European League with Partizan. Under the strong leadership of Danilović and the important support of Brunamonti, Claudio Coldebella, Paolo Moretti, Augusto Binelli and Bill Wennington, the team, coached by Ettore Messina, won its eleventh national championship, defeating 3–0 the Benetton Treviso. However the team was eliminated in the quarterfinals of the FIBA European League by Real Madrid Teka.

In the following season, Messina became the new coach of Italy's national basketball team and Alberto Bucci, returned to coach Virtus, with whom he had won a national championship in 1984. The team was completed with Cliff Levingston, two-time NBA champion with the Chicago Bulls. In the same year, Cazzola signed a deal with Buckler Beer, a brand of Heineken, which became the new sponsor of the team. In October 1993, Virtus took part to the McDonald's Open in Munich, where it arrived second, after the Phoenix Suns. In May 1994, Virtus won its second consecutive national title, defeating 3–2 Scavolini Pesaro, after a very contested final. Once again, the Black V was ousted during the FIBA European League quarterfinals by Olympiacos.

In the 1994–95 season, Joe Binion replaced Levingston, while the rest of the team remained untouched. In May 1995, Virtus won its 13th title, defeating 3–0 Benetton Treviso, accomplishing a so-called "three-peat". However, for the third consecutive times, the team which dominated the Italian league was eliminated at the FIBA European League quarterfinals, this time by Panathinaikos.

1995–1997: Transition years and Brunamonti's retirement
After the three-peat, Danilović left Virtus for the Miami Heat. Cazzola signed Arijan Komazec, a Croatian guard-forward, and Orlando Woolridge, a long-time NBA player; while young Italian players like Alessandro Abbio became increasingly important. In September 1995, Virtus won its first Italian Supercup against Benetton Treviso; while in October, the Black V participated in the McDonald's Championship, arriving second after the Houston Rockets. The team ended the regular season in first place, but he was eventually eliminated by Stefanel Milano in the playoffs' semi-finals. Moreover, the team did not succeed in passing the second group stage of the Champions Cup.

In 1996, captain Roberto Brunamonti retired from basketball after 14 seasons as a Virtus player. During the summer, the club signed important international players like Zoran Savić from Real Madrid Teka and Branislav Prelević from PAOK. Moreover, Kinder, a product brand line of Italian confectionery multinational Ferrero SpA, became the new sponsor of Virtus. On 8 March 1997, coach Bucci was replaced by Lino Frattin, who after a few days, won Black V's fifth Italian Cup against Cantù. The team was eliminated by Stefanel Milano in the Top 16 of the FIBA EuroLeague, the former Champions Cup. In the national playoffs, Virtus was eliminated in the semi-finals by the other Bologna's team, Teamsystem, which, after years of poor results, was becoming increasingly competitive.

1997–2000: Danilović's comeback and the first EuroLeague

In 1997, Roberto Brunamonti became team's general manager, while coach Messina and Sasha Danilović returned to Virtus and the team was completed with important international players like Radoslav Nesterovič, Antoine Rigaudeau, Hugo Sconochini and Alessandro Frosini, as well as with the confirmation of Zoran Savić and Alessandro Abbio. In the same year, the club moved to PalaMalaguti, an indoor sporting arena in Casalecchio di Reno with a seating capacity of more than 8,000 people, leaving PalaDozza after almost 40 years.

On 23 April 1998, Virtus won its first EuroLeague, defeating 58–44 AEK in Barcelona, with Savić elected MVP of the Final Four. While on 31 May, Virtus conquered its 14th national title, defeating in Game 5 of the final, Teamsystem Bologna. At twenty seconds from the end of the game, with Fortitudo leading by 4, Danilović scored a three-point shot and at the same time suffered a foul by Dominique Wilkins, completing the so-called "four-point shot". Then Virtus won the match in the overtime. The 1998 final between Virtus and Fortiudo is widely considered as the greatest one in the history of Italian basketball, with two teams from the same city, which were among the best ones in the continent. During this period, Bologna was nicknamed "Basket City", due to the fame and the victories of town's two teams.

In the following season, Virtus won its 7th Italian Cup in January 1999. The team also defeated Fortitudo 57–62 in a historic EuroLeague's semi-final in Munich, but it lost 82–74 in the final against Žalgiris of Tyus Edney and was eliminated in the semi-finals for the national championship by Treviso. In 1999–2000 season, the Black V lost the Italian Cup final against Treviso and was defeated 83–76 by AEK, in the FIBA Saporta Cup's final in Lausanne. Moreover, Virtus was once again eliminated by Treviso, in the semi-finals for the national championship.

In May 2000, Cazzola sold Virtus to Marco Madrigali, a video game entrepreneur, who became the new president of the club. Under Cazzola's presidency, Virtus lived a period which became known as its "Golden Age", in which the Black V won four national titles, two Italian Cups and a EuroLeague, becoming one of the most notable and successful teams in Europe.

2000–2003: The Madrigali era

2000–2002: Ginóbili's rise and the second EuroLeague

In the 2000–01 season, Madrigali and Brunamonti signed important players, like Marko Jarić, Manu Ginóbili, Matjaž Smodiš, Rashard Griffith and David Andersen; while at the beginning of the season, Sasha Danilović suddenly announced his retirement from basketball. The absence of a strong leader like Danilović and the subsequent ban for doping of another historic player like Hugo Sconochini, forced every single player of the team to take more responsibility, but at the same time opened spaces to the immature and talented newcomers, free to show their abilities and experience at a high level.

After a tough beginning, the season had a turning point during the Christmas derby against Fortitudo, which was soundly won by the Black V by 99–62. From then, Virtus started an outstanding season, characterized by an unrepeatable group capable of beating every record and becoming one of the strongest European teams of all time and, according to many, the strongest ever. On 28 April 2001, Virtus won its seventh Italian Cup against Pesaro, while on 10 May, the Black V won its second EuroLeague, defeating 3–2 Tau Cerámica, in the first and only series in the history of EuroLeague finals. Manu Ginóbili was elected Finals MVP. On 19 June, Virtus won its 15th national championship, beating Paf Wennington Bologna 3–0, while Ginobili was elected Italian League MVP too. After the double in 1997–98, in 2000–01 season, Virtus completed a so-called Triple Crown (known in Italy as Grande Slam), winning all the trophies that it could won.

In the following season, Virtus won its 8th Italian Cup, but after some defeats Madrigali fired Messina. However, after a field invasion by Virtus supporters before a match against Pallacanestro Trieste, Madrigali was forced to re-hire him. Despite this, the team lost 89–83 the EuroLeague final, which was held in PalaMalaguti, against Panathinaikos of Dejan Bodiroga and Željko Obradović, and was eliminated in the semi-finals for the national championship by Benetton Treviso.

2002–2003: Financial problems and interdiction
In 2003, Ginóbili moved to the NBA, where he played for the San Antonio Spurs, and Ettore Messina was hired by Benetton, thus Bogdan Tanjević was appointed new head coach. During the summer, due to contrasts with Madrigali, Brunamonti also left the club, after nearly 20 years spent as player and general manager.

After a soundly defeat in Fabriano, Tanjević was replaced by Valerio Bianchini, who failed in reaching the playoffs for the first time in Virtus history but succeeded in saving the team from relegation. However, suffering from serious financial problems, mainly caused by the failure of Madrigali's video game company CTO SpA, Virtus was excluded from the Serie A in August 2003, after missing payments to players, first of all the young Slovenian Sani Bečirovič.

2003–2013: The Sabatini era
The bankruptcy was avoided thanks to the intervention of a local trade fair entrepreneur, Claudio Sabatini, who transacted all the debts of the club, after agreements with creditors and took over the company from Madrigali. Sabatini acquired also the club Progresso Castelmaggiore, from a small town in Bologna's hinterland, which played in Serie A2 and sponsored the new team with FuturVirtus brand, guaranteeing, therefore, the continuity of the glorious name "Virtus" despite the exclusion from the championships.

2003–2005: Promotion to Serie A
In 2003–04 season, Sabatini signed important former NBA players like Charles Smith, Vonteego Cummings and Rick Brunson. The team was initially coached by Giampiero Ticchi, who was replaced in November by Alberto Bucci, Black V's historic coach. Despite good premises, FuturVirtus did not reach the promotion in Serie A, losing 3–0 in the final series of playoffs from Aurora Jesi.

During the summer of 2004 the club obtained the re-affiliation to the Italian Basketball Federation and the right to use the name "Virtus Pallacanestro" again. The team was completed, among others, with Corey Brewer, A.J. Guyton and Bennett Davison and was coached by Giordano Consolini, who served as Messina's assistant for years. On 3 June 2005, Virtus returned to the top division, defeating 3–0 the Premiata Montegranaro.

2005–2009: National finals and return to Europe

In the 2005–06 season, Sabatini hired Zare Markovski from Macedonia as new head coach and signed, among others, David Bluthenthal, Dušan Vukčević and Christian Drejer. Despite a good season's start the team ended 9th, out of the playoffs.

After the end of the season, Bluthenthal, who was Black V's top scorer, went to Fortitudo, while Virtus confirmed Vukčević and Drejer, as well as coach Markovski. Moreover, Sabatini signed Travis Best, a former NBA player for the Indiana Pacers, Brett Blizzard, Guilherme Giovannoni, Vlado Ilievski and Tyrone Grant. The team reached the Italian Cup final, losing against Benetton Treviso and placed second in the regular season, qualifying for the playoffs after a five-year absence. Markovski's team reached the championship finals, but it was defeated 3–0 by Montepaschi Siena. The Black V also reached the EuroCup semi-finals, where it was defeated by the Ukrainian team Azovmash Mariupol.

In the following summer, the team was suddenly reshaped and Markovski was fired by Sabatini, whose presidency was characterized by his fickle nature, which led him implementing unexpected and often unpopular choices. The president hired Stefano Pillastrini as new head coach and signed, among others, Alan Anderson, Delonte Holland, Dewarick Spencer and Roberto Chiacig. Virtus participated in the EuroLeague, but arrived last in the Group A, winning only two games out of 14. In January 2008, Pillastrini was fired and Renato Pasquali became the new coach; after few months Sabatini re-signed Travis Best, who led the team to the second consecutive Italian Cup final, lost against Avellino. However, Virtus ended the season at the 16th place.

In 2008–09 season, the team was completely renewed with prominent players like the former NBA player Earl Boykins, Keith Langford, Sharrod Ford and the re-sign of Dušan Vukčević. After few months, coach Pasquali was succeeded by Matteo Boniciolli. On 21 February, Virtus played its third consecutive Italian Cup final, which once again lost against Siena. On 26 April 2009, Virtus won the European third tier trophy, the EuroChallenge, against Cholet Basket, thanks to 21 points of the Final Four MVP Keith Langford. The team ended the regular season at the 5th place and was eliminated in the first round of national playoffs by Treviso. Boniciolli was immediately fired by president Sabatini and the team was reshaped again during summer.

2009–2013: Transition years
In the following season, Sabatini hired Lino Lardo as head coach and appointed Vukčević as team's captain. He also signed, among others, David Moss, Andre Collins, Petteri Koponen and Viktor Sanikidze. Virtus lost its fourth consecutive Italian Cup final and ended the season 5th, being eliminated 3–2 in the first round of the playoffs by Cantù. In 2010–11, the team was completed with Giuseppe Poeta, Valerio Amoroso, Jared Homan, as well as K.C. Rivers from 2011. The Black V ended the regular season 8th and was eliminated in the first round of the playoffs by Siena.

In 2011–2012, Sabatini hired Alessandro Finelli as new coach and signed important players like Chris Douglas-Roberts, a former NBA players, Terrell McIntyre and Angelo Gigli. In late 2011, Sabatini sold Virtus to a foundation of local entrepreneurs, however, he remained as CEO and de facto general manager. At the end of the regular season, the Black V arrived 5th, being eliminated by Dinamo Sassari, in the first round of the playoffs. In the following season, Virtus signed, among others, Steven Smith, Richard Mason Rocca and Jacob Pullen. During the season, Luca Bechi succeeded Finelli as new head coach. The team ended the season at the 14th place.

2013–2016: Struggles and relegation
After years of poor successes, Sabatini definitively exited from the club and in 2013, Renato Villalta, a former Virtus star, was appointed president. In 2013–14 season, Virtus signed, among others, Matt Waksh, Willie Warren and Shawn King. In January 2014, Bechi was sacked due to poor results, and Giorgio Valli became the new coach. However, the team arrived 13th, out of the playoffs.

In 2014–15 season, Virtus returned to the playoffs, thanks to an outstanding season of its top-scorers Allan Ray, Jeremy Hazell and Okaro White. However, it was eliminated in the first round by Olimpia Milan.

In the following year Villalta was abruptly removed from his post and Francesco Bertolini was appointed president by the foundation. After a few months, Bertolini was replaced too by Alberto Bucci, the former Virtus coach, who won three national titles with the Black V between 1980s and 1990s. However, the season was characterized by a serious injury to team captain, Allan Ray, and the substitute players signed by the club failed to adequately replace the injured top-player. On 4 May 2016, at the end of the regular season the team ranked 16th and last, therefore it was relegated to Serie A2 for the first time in its history.

2016–present: The Zanetti era

2016–2019: Promotion and Champions League

In the following summer, president Bucci announced Alessandro Ramagli as new head coach of Virtus. The club built a good team for the league, led by important players such as Guido Rosselli, Klaudio Ndoja, Michael Umeh and Kenny Lawson. During the season an important change in ownership occurred: the coffee entrepreneur and former politician, Massimo Zanetti, owner of Segafredo, who was also team's sponsor, became the majority shareholder of the club. Virtus ended second in the regular season behind Treviso and on 19 June 2017, won the playoffs, beating Trieste by 3–0, thus returning to the top series after only one year. During the playoffs, the Black V returned after more than twenty years to Bologna's historic arena, PalaDozza, which became the new official home court in the following season.

In summer 2017, the club signed two of the most prominent Italian players, Pietro Aradori and Alessandro Gentile, as well as two international players like Marcus Slaughter and Oliver Lafayette. Despite good premises, the team was eliminated in the first round of Italian Cup's Final Eight and failed to qualify for the championship playoffs.

The 2018–19 season began with the appointment of Alessandro Dalla Salda as new club's CEO and the hire of Stefano Sacripanti as new head coach. Aradori and Filippo Baldi Rossi were confirmed and the club signed, among others, Tony Taylor, Kevin Punter, Amath M'Baye and Brian Qvale, to participate in the Basketball Champions League, which was Virtus's first European competition after ten years. The team reached a record of seven wins in the first seven games of the continental competition, which had never been achieved before. In March 2019, the team signed Mario Chalmers, two-time NBA champion with the Miami Heat. On 9 March, president Alberto Bucci died at 70 years old, due to complications from a cancer. On 11 March, after a defeat against Cantù and with Virtus temporarily out of playoffs, the team board sacked Sacripanti and appointed the Serbian Aleksandar Đorđević as new head coach. On 4 April, the Black V defeated Nanterre 92, reaching the BCL Final Four in Antwerp, which won on 5 May defeating Iberostar Tenerife 73–61, thanks to an outstanding game by Kevin Punter, who was able to score 26 points and was nominated Final Four MVP. The BCL was the fifth European title in team's history and the first one after ten years.

In July 2019, Virtus opened its women's basketball wing, to participate in the Serie A1 championship. In the same month, Giuseppe Sermasi, a local entrepreneur and former vice president, became Virtus new president, holding the vacant post after Bucci's death, while Luca Baraldi, a prominent manager of Segafredo, was appointed new CEO.

2019–present: Teodosić's years, the 16th title and the EuroCup

On 13 July, Virtus signed a three-year deal with Miloš Teodosić, 2016 EuroLeague champion and former NBA player, who was widely considered one of the best European point guard of all time. In August, the Black V signed Kyle Weems, a small forward from Tofaş, and Stefan Marković, a point guard from BC Khimki who, along with Teodosić, would become the backbone of the team in the following seasons. Among others, the club signed also Vince Hunter, Julian Gamble and Giampaolo Ricci. In the 2019–20 season, Virtus played some home games, including the derby against Fortitudo won 94–62, at the Virtus Segafredo Arena, a temporary indoor arena with a capacity of nearly 10,000 seats, located in the Fiera District.

On 7 April 2020, after more than a month of suspension, the Italian Basketball Federation officially ended the 2019–20 season, due to the COVID-19 pandemic that severely hit Italy. Virtus ended the season first, with 18 wins and only 2 defeats, but the title was not assigned. On 5 May, the EuroLeague's commissioner Jordi Bertomeu announced the cancellation of the EuroCup season too. Virtus, which had achieved the league's playoffs, was confirmed for the following season.

After the early end of the season, the team was largely confirmed for the following championship and, in May and June, the club signed prominent Italian players, like Awudu Abass and Amedeo Tessitori, and homegrown ones, like Amar Alibegović. In September, Virtus hosted the Supercup's Final Four at the Segafredo Arena, but it lost against Olimpia Milan 75–68; the Supercup was the first competition since the cancellation of the previous season. In November 2020, Virtus signed a three-year deal with Marco Belinelli, from the San Antonio Spurs. Belinelli, one of the greatest Italian players of all time and 2014 NBA Champion, started his career with Virtus in the early 2000s. The season was also characterized by the emergence of Alessandro Pajola, the young Italian point guard who became one team's most important players. In April 2021, despite a winning record of 19–2, Virtus was defeated in the EuroCup's semifinals by UNICS Kazan. However, the season ended with a great success. In fact, after having knocked out 3–0 both Basket Treviso in the quarterfinals and New Basket Brindisi in the semifinals, on 11 June Virtus defeated 4–0 its historic rival Olimpia Milano in the national finals, winning its 16th national title and the first one after twenty years. Teodosić was appointed MVP of the finals.

On 15 June, after a few days from the victory, Đorđević was not confirmed as head coach at the end of his two-year contract, due to some tensions with the club's ownership occurred during the season. On 18 June, the club hired the new head coach, signing a three-year deal with Sergio Scariolo, from the Toronto Raptors. Moreover, Marković, Hunter, Gamble and Ricci were not renewed, while in July and August 2021 Virtus signed important foreign players like Ekpe Udoh, Kevin Hervey and Mouhammadou Jaiteh, as well as one of the most talented Italian point guards, Nico Mannion, from the Golden State Warriors. On 21 September, the team won its second Supercup, defeating Olimpia Milano 90–84. However, during the same month, Udoh and Abass suffered serious knee injuries and Virtus signed JaKarr Sampson from the Indiana Pacers and Isaïa Cordinier from Nanterre 92 to replace them.

On 28 October 2021, Zanetti was elected president of Virtus, succeeding Giuseppe Sermasi at the head of the club, and became the only shareholder after a €2 million capital increase. In early 2022, the Russian invasion of Ukraine and the subsequent international sanctions againt Russia forced all international players to leave the country. On 3 March, Virtus signed the Italian point guard Daniel Hackett, while on 7 March, the club reached an agreement with the Georgian power forward Tornike Shengelia, both of them from CSKA Moscow.

Despite a tough EuroCup regular season ended at the fourth place, Virtus ousted Lietkabelis, Ulm and Valencia in the first three rounds of the playoffs and, on 11 May 2022, defeated Frutti Extra Bursaspor by 80–67 at the Segafredo Arena, winning its first EuroCup and qualifying for the EuroLeague after 14 years. With 21 points scored, the Serbian point guard Miloš Teodosić was once again appointed MVP of the final. However, despite having ended the regular season at the first place and having ousted 3–0 both Pesaro and Tortona in the first two rounds of playoffs, Virtus was defeated 4–2 in the national finals by Olimpia Milan.

During the following summer, Udoh, Hervey, Sampson, Alibegović and Tessitori left the club, but Virtus confirmed the backbone of the roster, notably including Shengelia, who was renewed until June 2024. Moreover, the club signed prominent foreign players like Jordan Mickey, Gabriel Lundberg, Semi Ojeleye and Ismaël Bako. On 29 September 2022, after having ousted Milano in the semifinals, Virtus won its third Supercup, defeating 72–69 Banco di Sardegna Sassari and achieving a back-to-back, following the 2021 trophy.

Logos

Arena
Since its foundation, Virtus Bologna has changed several home arenas. Each of them was more than just a basketball court, rather a real "house" of the Black V, marking, in the period when they were used, a different era of the long club's history:

In 2019, the club has closed a deal to build a new arena with 12,000 seating capacity in the Fiera District, not far away from the temporary Virtus Segafredo Arena.

Honours

Domestic competitions
 Italian League
 Winners (16): 1945–46, 1946–47, 1947–48, 1948–49, 1954–55, 1955–56, 1975–76, 1978–79, 1979–80, 1983–84, 1992–93, 1993–94, 1994–95, 1997–98, 2000–01, 2020–21
 Runners-up (18): 1935, 1936, 1937–38, 1939–40, 1942–43, 1949–50, 1951–52, 1952–53, 1956–57, 1957–58, 1958–59, 1959–60, 1960–61, 1976–77, 1977–78, 1980–81, 2006–07, 2021–22
 Italian Cup
 Winners (8): 1973–74, 1983–84, 1988–89, 1989–90, 1996–97, 1998–99, 2000–01, 2001–02
 Runners-up (6): 1992–93, 1999–00, 2006–07, 2007–08, 2008–09, 2009–10
 Italian Supercup
 Winners (3): 1995, 2021, 2022
 Runners-up (8): 1997, 1998, 1999, 2000, 2002, 2009, 2010, 2020
 Italian LNP Cup
 Winners (1): 2017
 Italian Serie A2
 Winners (1): 2016–17

European competitions
 EuroLeague
 Winners (2): 1997–98, 2000–01
 Runners-up (3): 1980–81, 1998–99, 2001–02
 4th place (1): 1979–80
 Final Four (3): 1998, 1999, 2002
 EuroCup
 Winners (1): 2021–22
 Semifinalists (1): 2020–21
 FIBA Saporta Cup (defunct)
 Winners (1): 1989–90
 Runners-up (2): 1977–78, 1999–00
 Semifinalists (2): 1978–79, 1981–82
 Basketball Champions League
 Winners (1): 2018–19 
 FIBA EuroChallenge (defunct)
 Winners (1): 2008–09
 FIBA EuroCup (defunct)
 3rd place (1): 2006–07

Worldwide competitions
 FIBA Intercontinental Cup
 Runners-up (1): 2020

 McDonald's Championship (defunct)
 Runners-up (2): 1993, 1995

Unofficial
 Triple Crown
 Winners (1): 2000–01

Season by season

Top performances in European and Worldwide competitions

The road to the European cups victories

1989–90 FIBA European Cup Winner's Cup

1997–98 FIBA EuroLeague

2000–01 EuroLeague

2008–09 FIBA EuroChallenge

2018–19 Basketball Champions League

2021–22 EuroCup

Players

Current roster

Depth chart

Notable players

Retired numbers

Naismith Memorial Basketball Hall of Famers
 Krešimir Ćosić, C, 1978–1980, Inducted 1996

FIBA Hall of Famers
 Krešimir Ćosić, C, 1978–1980, Inducted 2007
 Aleksandar Nikolić, Head coach, 1981–1982, Inducted 2007
 Antoine Rigaudeau, PG, 1997–2003, Inducted 2015
 Bogdan Tanjević, Head coach, 2002, Inducted 2019
 Jure Zdovc, PG, 1991–1992, Inducted 2021
 Ettore Messina, Head coach, 1989–1993 and 1997–2002, Inducted 2021

Other notable players

Players at the NBA draft

Head coaches

 Renzo Poluzzi (1948–1951)
 Dino Fontana (1950–1951)
 Venzo Vannini (1951–1952)
 Larry Strong (1952–1953)
 Giancarlo Marinelli (1953–1954)
 Vittorio Tracuzzi (1954–1960)
 Eduard Kucharski (1960–1963)
 Mario Alesini (1963–1966)
 Jaroslav Šíp  (1966–1968)
 Renzo Ranuzzi (1968–1969)
 Nello Paratore (1969–1970)
 Vittorio Tracuzzi (1970–1971)
 Nico Messina (1971–1973)
 Dan Peterson (1973–1978)
 Terry Driscoll (1978–1980)
 Ettore Zuccheri (1980–1981)
 Renzo Ranuzzi (1981)
 Aleksandar Nikolić (1981–1982)
 George Bisacca (1982)
 Mauro Di Vincenzo (1982–1983)
 Alberto Bucci (1983–1985)
 Alessandro Gamba (1985–1987)
 Krešimir Ćosić (1987–1988)
 Bob Hill (1988–1989)
 Ettore Messina (1989–1993)
 Alberto Bucci (1993–1997)
 Lino Frattin (1997)
 Ettore Messina (1997–2002)
 Bogdan Tanjević (2002)
 Valerio Bianchini (2002–2003)
 Giampiero Ticchi (2003)
 Alberto Bucci (2003–2004)
 Giordano Consolini (2004–2005)
 Zare Markovski (2005–2007)
 Stefano Pillastrini (2007–2008)
 Renato Pasquali (2008)
 Matteo Boniciolli (2008–2009)
 Lino Lardo (2009–2011)
 Alessandro Finelli (2011–2013)
 Luca Bechi (2013–2014)
 Giorgio Valli (2014–2016)
 Alessandro Ramagli (2016–2018)
 Stefano Sacripanti (2018–2019)
 Aleksandar Đorđević (2019–2021)
 Sergio Scariolo (2021–present)

Sponsorship names
Throughout the years, due to sponsorship, the club has been known as :

 Minganti Bologna (1953–1958)
 Oransoda Bologna (1958–1960)
 Idrolitina Bologna (1960–1961)
 Virtus Bologna (1961–1962)
 Knorr Bologna (1962–1965)
 Candy Bologna (1965–1969)
 Virtus Bologna (1969–1970)
 Norda Bologna (1970–1974)
 Sinudyne Bologna (1974–1983)
 Granarolo Bologna (1983–1986)
 Dietor Bologna (1986–1988)
 Knorr Bologna (1988–1993)
 Buckler Beer Bologna (1993–1996)
 Kinder Bologna (1996–2002)
 Virtus Bologna (2002–2003)
 Carisbo Bologna (2003–2004)
 Caffè Maxim Bologna (2004–2005)
 VidiVici Bologna (2005–2007)
 La Fortezza Bologna (2007–2009)
 Canadian Solar Bologna (2009–2012)
 SAIE3 Bologna (2012–2013)
 Oknoplast Bologna (2013)
 Granarolo Bologna (2013–2015)
 Obiettivo Lavoro Bologna (2015–2016)
 Virtus Segafredo Bologna (2016–present)

Kit manufacturer

 1977–1983: Lotto
 1983–1988: Les Copains
 1988–1996: Reebok
 1996–1999: Fila
 1999–2009: Champion
 2009–present: Macron

References

External links

  
Historical record and names at Lega Basket Serie A Retrieved 27 June 2015 

 
1929 establishments in Italy
Basketball teams established in 1929
Basketball teams in Emilia-Romagna
EuroLeague-winning clubs
Sport in Bologna